This is a list of notable events in music that took place in the year 1977. This year was the peak of vinyl sales in the United States, with sales declining year on year since then.


Specific locations
1977 in British music
1977 in Norwegian music

Specific genres
1977 in country music
1977 in heavy metal music
1977 in jazz

Events

January–February
January 1 – The Clash headline the opening night of London's only punk rock club, The Roxy
January 6 – After releasing only one single for controversial English punk rock band the Sex Pistols, EMI terminates its contract with them in response to its members' disruptive behaviour last month on ITV's Today and two days ago at London Heathrow Airport
January 20 – Jimmy Buffett's Changes in Latitudes, Changes in Attitudes is released, featuring the biggest single of his career, "Margaritaville"
January 22 – German cellist Maria Kliegel makes her London debut at the Wigmore Hall, with a programme of Bach, Kodály, and Franck
January 26 – Patti Smith falls off the stage while opening for Bob Seger in Tampa, Florida, and is rushed to the hospital for 22 stitches to close head lacerations
February 4
Paul Desmond gives his last concert with Dave Brubeck, in New York
American Bandstand celebrates its 25th anniversary on television with a special hosted by Dick Clark; an "all-star band", performing "Roll Over Beethoven", is made up of Chuck Berry, Seals & Crofts, Gregg Allman, Junior Walker, Johnny Rivers, the Pointer Sisters, Charlie Daniels, Doc Severinsen, Les McCann, Donald Byrd, Chuck Mangione and three members of Booker T and the MGs
Fleetwood Mac's widely anticipated Rumours is released; it goes on to become one of the best-selling albums of all time
February 14 – The B-52's give their first public performance at a party in Athens, Georgia
February 15 – Sid Vicious replaces Glen Matlock as the bassist of the Sex Pistols.
February 19 – The 19th Annual Grammy Awards are presented in Los Angeles, hosted for the final time by Andy Williams. Stevie Wonder's Songs in the Key of Life wins Album of the Year, George Benson's "This Masquerade" wins Record of the Year and Barry Manilow's "I Write the Songs" wins Song of the Year. Starland Vocal Band win Best New Artist.

March–May
March 1 – Sara Lowndes Dylan files for divorce from her husband of 11 years, Bob Dylan
March 4 & 5 – The Rolling Stones play two shows at the El Mocambo club in Toronto
April – Van Morrison releases a new album, A Period of Transition, after a nearly three-year absence
March 10 – A&M Records signs the Sex Pistols in a ceremony in front of Buckingham Palace; this contract is terminated on March 16 as a result of the band vandalizing property and verbally abusing employees during a visit to the record company's office
April 21 – Jesse Winchester, who fled to Canada in January 1967 to avoid military service in Vietnam, performs a concert in Burlington, Vermont, his first on American soil in ten years having recently become free to return under the Presidential pardon given to all draft evaders
April 22 – Pink Floyd open the North American leg of their "Animals" tour in Miami, Florida
April 24 – Several artists, including Joan Baez and Santana, perform at a free concert for 653 inmates of California's Soledad Prison
April 26 – New York's disco Studio 54 opens.
April 30 – Led Zeppelin sets a new world record attendance for an indoor solo attraction at the Pontiac Silverdome when 76,229 people attend a concert here on the group's 1977 North American Tour.
May 2 – Elton John performs the first of six consecutive nights at London's Rainbow Theatre, his first concert in eight months
May 7 – Having been postponed from April 2 because of a BBC technicians' strike, the 22nd Eurovision Song Contest finally goes ahead in London's Wembley Conference Centre: the winner is Marie Myriam representing France with "L'oiseau et l'enfant"; the British entry, Lynsey de Paul and Michael Moran's "Rock Bottom", comes 2nd
May 11 – Punk rock band The Stranglers and support London start a 10-week national UK tour
May 12
Instruments made by all five members of the 17th- and 18th-century Guarneri family of violin makers are auctioned at Sotheby's, with the top price of £105,000 paid for an instrument made in 1738 by Giuseppe Guarneri del Gesù
Virgin Records announce that they have signed the Sex Pistols, the group having had contracts with two previous labels terminated in 4 months
May 28 – Bruce Springsteen and Mike Appel reach an out-of-court settlement, ending the year-long legal battle that has blocked Springsteen's ability to record new music
May 29 – Elvis Presley walks offstage in the middle of a concert  in Baltimore, Maryland, the first time in his twenty-three year career he has done so; after receiving treatment from a physician, he reappears onstage thirty minutes later 
May 31 – The musical Beatlemania is premièred at the Winter Garden Theatre on Manhattan

June–August
June 7 
The Nikikai Opera Foundation is founded in Japan
The Sex Pistols attempt to interrupt Silver Jubilee celebrations for Queen Elizabeth II by performing their version of "God Save the Queen" from a boat on the River Thames
June 12
Guitarist Michael Schenker vanishes after a UFO concert at The Roundhouse in London (he is replaced for several months by Paul Chapman)
The Supremes perform for the last time together at Drury Lane Theatre in London before officially disbanding
June 15 – The Snape Maltings Training Orchestra makes its London debut at St John's, Smith Square
June 20 – Grateful Dead drummer Mickey Hart drives his Porsche over the edge of a canyon, suffering multiple broken bones but surviving as a tree breaks his fall
June 22 – Kiss are elected "most popular band in America" by a Gallup poll
June 26 – Elvis Presley sings his final concert before his death, at Market Square Arena, Indianapolis, Indiana. Earlier that day, he has received a plaque commemorating the two billionth pressing from RCA's record pressing plant in Camden, New Jersey
July 9 – Donna Summer's hit record "I Feel Love" is released in the UK; it is the first hit record to have an entirely synthesised backing track
July 13 – After a massive blackout hits New York City, NRBQ manages to play an all-acoustic set at The Bottom Line with flashlights taped to their microphone stands
July 22 – The first night of The Proms are broadcast in quadraphonic sound by BBC Radio 3 for the first time
July 26 – Led Zeppelin cancels the last seven dates of their American tour after lead singer Robert Plant learns that his six-year-old son Karac has died of a respiratory virus (The show two days before in Oakland proves to be the band's last in the United States)
August 16 – Elvis Presley is found dead at his home Graceland in Memphis, Tennessee. Also that same day, the final concert of Bing Crosby takes place in England, accompanied by Johnny Smith.
August 17 – Florists Transworld Delivery (FTD) reports that in one day the number of orders for flowers to be delivered to Graceland for the funeral of Elvis Presley has surpassed the number for any other event in the company's history
August 18 – The funeral of Elvis Presley takes place at Graceland. 
August 20 – NASA's unmanned probe Voyager 2 is launched carrying a golden record containing sounds and images representing life and culture on Earth, including the first movements of J. S. Bach's Brandenburg Concerto and Beethoven's Fifth Symphony, Guan Pinghu's Liu Shui, played on the guqin, and Chuck Berry's "Johnny B. Goode"

September–December
September 1 – World première at the Royal Albert Hall in London of the expanded version of Luciano Berio's Coro
September 3 – Nearly 110,000 fans pack Englishtown Raceway in Old Bridge, New Jersey, for an 11-hour concert by Grateful Dead, Marshall Tucker Band and New Riders of the Purple Sage
September 15 – The third – and final – annual Rock Music Awards aired on NBC (Fleetwood Mac dominates, winning five awards while Linda Ronstadt receives the Best Rock Female Vocalist trophy for the third time
September 16 – T. Rex frontman Marc Bolan is killed as a passenger in an automobile accident in Barnes, London
September 29 – Billy Joel's The Stranger is released containing "Movin' Out (Anthony's Song)", "Just the Way You Are" and "Only the Good Die Young"
October 3 – Elvis in Concert, a TV concert special filmed during Elvis Presley's final tour, is aired on CBS; Canadian Channel CKND-DT simulcasts it. It got bad reviews. 
October 5 – The bicentennial season of La Scala opens in Milan with a production of Giuseppe Verdi's Don Carlo
October 9 – Aerosmith cancels several tour dates after Joe Perry and Steven Tyler are injured by an M-80 explosive thrown onstage at the Philadelphia Spectrum, burning Tyler's left cornea and cutting Perry's left hand
October 20 – A plane carrying Lynyrd Skynyrd crashes in a forest in Mississippi, killing songwriter & vocalist Ronnie Van Zant, guitarist Steve Gaines, background vocalist Cassie Gaines and assistant road manager Dean Kilpatrick and seriously injuring many of the remaining band members
October 27 – British punk band Sex Pistols release Never Mind the Bollocks, Here's the Sex Pistols on the Virgin Records label. Despite refusal by major UK retailers to stock it, it debuts at number one on the UK Album Charts the week after its release. In a promotional stunt the group perform on a boat on the River Thames shortly afterwards, only for the police to wait for them and make several arrests, including that of Malcolm McLaren, the band's manager at this time
October 28 – British rock band Queen release the album News of the World
October 31 – The original version of Karlheinz Stockhausen's Jahreslauf is premièred at the National Theatre of Japan in Chiyoda, Tokyo, by the Imperial Gagaku Ensemble
November 25 – 10 Years of Rolling Stone, a television special commemorating the tenth anniversary of Rolling Stone magazine, airs on CBS in the United States; guests include Bette Midler, Art Garfunkel, Billy Preston, Melissa Manchester and Keith Moon
November 30 – Bing Crosby's final Christmas television special, Bing Crosby's Merrie Olde Christmas, airs on CBS (containing the notable segment of Crosby joined by David Bowie for the duet "Peace on Earth/Little Drummer Boy")
December 14 – Saturday Night Fever appears in movie theaters, igniting a new popularity for disco music and pushing it to the forefront of American pop culture, with the soundtrack to the film by Bee Gees (who have composed most of the tracks)
December 17 – Elvis Costello makes his American television début on Saturday Night Live as a last-minute replacement for the Sex Pistols, who were refused visas to enter America; Costello is banned after substituting the scheduled performance of "Less than Zero" with "Radio, Radio" instead
December 31 – The sixth annual New Year's Rockin' Eve special airs on ABC and the United States, with performances by Ohio Players, Crystal Gayle, Kenny Rogers, KC and the Sunshine Band and Andy Gibb

Also in 1977
"Bohemian Rhapsody" named "The Best Single Of The Last 25 Years" by BPI
St Magnus Festival of the Arts founded in Orkney by local resident, composer Sir Peter Maxwell Davies
The Badisches Staatstheater Karlsruhe begins its annual festival based on the music of George Frideric Handel
Luigi Sagrati becomes president of the Unione Musicisti di Roma
The IRCAM Center, a scientific institute for music and sound and avant-garde electro-acoustical art music, opens in Paris
The Cars sign a contract with Elektra Records
Devo signs a contract with Warner Bros
Midnight Oil sign a contract with CBS Records
The Neville Brothers sign a contract with A&M Records
The Police sign a contract with A&M Records
Van Halen signs a contract with Warner Bros

Bands formed
See :Category:Musical groups established in 1977

Bands reformed
The Animals

Bands disbanded
See :Category:Musical groups disestablished in 1977

Albums released

January

February

March

April

May

June

July

August

September

October

November

December

Release date unknown

15 Years On – The Dubliners
Alien Soundtracks – Chrome (band)
Aliens – Horslips
American Roulette – Danny O'Keefe
Be Seeing You – Dr. Feelgood
Black Noise – FMBlack Vinyl Shoes – ShoesBlue Hotel – FoxBop-Be – Keith JarrettThe Boys – The BoysBTO Live – Japan Tour (live) – Bachman–Turner OverdriveBullinamingvase – Roy HarperBundle of Joy – Freddie HubbardByablue – Keith JarrettCabretta – Mink DeVilleCalling on Youth – The OutsidersCircles in the Stream – Bruce Cockburn – LiveClose Encounters of the Third Kind: Original Motion Picture Soundtrack – John WilliamsCluster & Eno – Cluster & EnoCome In from the Rain – Captain & TennilleCome to Me – Juice Newton and Silver SpurComing Back for More – William BellConsequences – Godley & CremeDark Magus – Miles Davis – Live 1974The David Grisman Quintet - David GrismanDelilah's Power – Ike & Tina TurnerDerringer Live – Derringer – LiveThe Diodes – The DiodesDreams, Dreams, Dreams – Chilliwack
East of the River Nile – Augustus Pablo
Elegant Gypsy – Al Di Meola
Encore – Tangerine Dream
Equal Rights – Peter Tosh
Evolution (The Most Recent) - Taj Mahal
Face to Face: A Live Recording – Steve Harley & Cockney Rebel
Fandango – FandangoFeelin' Bitchy – Millie JacksonGame, Dames and Guitar Thangs – Eddie HazelGeorge Thorogood and the Destroyers – George Thorogood and the Destroyers
Gleanings – John Coltrane
Glitter Grass from the Nashwood Hollyville Strings - John Hartford, Doug Dillard, Rodney Dillard
Goddo – Goddo
Graham Bonnet – Graham Bonnet
The Guitar Syndicate – Hank Marvin
Halloween – Pulsar
Heart of the Congos – The Congos
Home on the Range – Slim Whitman
Hurry Sundown – Outlaws
I Came to Dance – Nils Lofgren
I'm a Man – Bo Diddley
If Wishes Were Horses – Sweeney Todd 
In City Dreams – Robin Trower
It Feels So Good – The Manhattans
Joe Ely – Joe Ely
Just a Stone's Throw Away – Valerie Carter
Just a Story from America – Elliott Murphy
Kenny Rogers – Kenny Rogers 
Life on the Line – Eddie and the Hot Rods
A Little Street Music – Cambridge Buskers
Live – Golden Earring – Live
Live at the El Mocambo – April Wine

Live at Montreux – The Dubliners
Live at the Old Quarter, Houston, Texas – Townes Van Zandt – Live 1973
Live in Japan – The Runaways 
Look to the Rainbow – Al Jarreau
Magic Fly – Space
A Maid in Bedlam – John Renbourn Group
Majida El Roumi – Majida El Roumi
Makin' Magic – Pat Travers
Making a Good Thing Better – Olivia Newton-John
Manifest Destiny – The Dictators
Marin County Line – New Riders of the Purple SageMark Farner – Mark FarnerMalcolm Rebenneck - Dr. JohnMarlena – Die FlippersMenagerie – Bill WithersMessage Man – Eddy GrantMontreux '77 – Ella FitzgeraldMusic Fuh Ya' (Musica Para Tu) - Taj Mahal Never Letting Go – Phoebe SnowNew Horizon – Isaac HayesThe Night Tripper - Dr. JohnNice to Be Around – Rosemary ClooneyOn Earth as It Is in Heaven – AngelThe Original Disco Duck – Rick Dees'A paggella – Mario TreviPeter McCann – Peter McCannPhotoplay – SherbetA Place in the Sun – Pablo CruisePlay Me Out – Glenn Hughes
Playing to an Audience of One – David Soul
Playmates – Small FacesPolice and Thieves – Junior MurvinProtest – Bunny WailerPutting It Straight – Pat TraversRam Jam – Ram JamRed River Valley – Slim WhitmanReencuentro – José JoséRegeneration – Roy OrbisonRichard Clayderman – Richard ClaydermanRick Danko – Rick Danko Ridin' High – MoxyRock 'n' Roll with the Modern Lovers – Jonathan Richman and the Modern LoversRose Royce II: In Full Bloom – Rose RoyceRough Diamond – Rough Diamond
Scarabus – Ian Gillan BandSergio Franchi / Volare – Sergio Franchi (RCA 15th Anniv. Tribute to Franchi)Sleeping Gypsy – Michael FranksSongs of Kristofferson – Kris KristoffersonSpiral – VangelisSupernature (Cerrone III) – Cerrone
Sweet Evil – Derringer
Taking Off – Neil Innes
Tanz Samba mit Mir – Tony Holiday
To You All – KrokusTwo Sevens Clash – CultureUnmistakably Lou – Lou RawlsThe Visitation – ChromeVisitors – Automatic ManWatercolors – Pat MethenyWe Must Believe in Magic – Crystal GayleWhen You Hear Lou, You've Heard It All – Lou RawlsYou Light Up My Life – Debby BooneYoung Men Gone West – City Boy

Biggest hit singles
The following songs achieved the highest chart positions
in the charts of 1977.

Chronological table of US and UK number one hit singles

Top 40 Chart hit singles

Other Chart hit singles

Notable singles

Other notable singles

Published popular music
"After the Lovin'" w. Richie Adams m. Alan Bernstein
"Annie" w. Martin Charnin m. Charles Strouse from the musical Annie"Brazzle Dazzle Day" w.m. Al Kasha & Joel Hirschhorn, from the film Pete's Dragon"But the World Goes 'Round"  w. Fred Ebb m. John Kander. Introduced by Liza Minnelli in the film New York City"Child In A Universe" w.m. Laura Nyro
"Come In From The Rain"     w.m. Melissa Manchester & Carole Bayer Sager
"Easy Street" w. Martin Charnin m. Charles Strouse from the musical Annie"The Greatest Love of All"     w. Linda Creed m. Michael Masser
"Happy Endings" w. Fred Ebb m. John Kander. Introduced by Liza Minnelli, Larry Kert and chorus in the film New York, New York"Here You Come Again"     w.m. Barry Mann & Cynthia Weil
"I Don't Need Anything But You" w. Martin Charnin m. Charles Strouse from the musical Annie"I Think I'm Gonna Like It Here" w. Martin Charnin m. Charles Strouse from the musical Annie"It's Not Easy" w.m. Al Kasha & Joel Hirschhorn, from the film Pete's Dragon"It's the Hard-Knock Life"  w. Martin Charnin m. Charles Strouse from the musical Annie"Just the Way You Are" w.m. Billy Joel
"Little Girls" w. Martin Charnin m. Charles Strouse from the musical Annie"The Love Boat theme song" w.m. Norman Gimbel & Paul Williams
"Love Is in the Air"     w.m. George Young & Harry Vanda
"Maybe" w. Martin Charnin m. Charles Strouse from the musical Annie"Maybe I'm Amazed" w.m. Paul McCartney
"Movin' Out (Anthony's Song)" w.m. Billy Joel
"N.Y.C." w. Martin Charnin m. Charles Strouse from the musical Annie"A New Deal For Christmas" w. Martin Charnin m. Charles Strouse from the musical Annie"New York, New York"     w.m. Fred Ebb & John Kander.  Introduced by Liza Minnelli in the film New York City"Nobody Does It Better"     w. Carole Bayer Sager m. Marvin Hamlisch
"She's Always a Woman" w.m. Billy Joel
"Someone's Waiting for You"      w. Carol Connors & Ayn Robbins m. Sammy Fain from the film The Rescuers"Something Was Missing" w. Martin Charnin m. Charles Strouse from the musical Annie"Star Wars-Main Theme" m. John Williams from the Star Wars films
"Stayin' Alive"     w.m. Barry Gibb, Maurice Gibb & Robin Gibb
"Thank You for the Music"     w.m. Benny Andersson & Björn Ulvaeus
"There Goes the Ball Game" w. Fred Ebb m. John Kander. Introduced by Liza Minnelli in the film New York, New York"Tomorrow"     w. Martin Charnin m. Charles Strouse, from the musical Annie"We'd Like to Thank You, Herbert Hoover" w. Martin Charnin m. Charles Strouse from the musical Annie"You Won't Be an Orphan for Long" w. Martin Charnin m. Charles Strouse from the musical Annie"You're Never Fully Dressed Without a Smile" w. Martin Charnin m. Charles Strouse, from the musical AnniePunk rock, new wave music, and mod revival

1977 marks the beginning of the punk rock movement. Several albums associated with the development of punk music were released, including Never Mind the Bollocks, Here's the Sex Pistols by the Sex Pistols, The Clash by The Clash, Damned Damned Damned by The Damned, the Dead Boys' Young, Loud and Snotty, Johnny Thunders and the Heartbreakers' L.A.M.F.,  the Ramones' Rocket to Russia, Richard Hell and the Voidoids' Blank Generation, and Wire's Pink Flag.

The year saw the release of debut albums by bands associated with punk rock, though also with other new music genres, such as the mod revival and new wave music, including In the City by The Jam, My Aim Is True by Elvis Costello, Suicide by Suicide, Marquee Moon by Television, and Talking Heads: 77 by Talking Heads. It also saw the release of Iggy Pop's Lust for Life, his second record as a solo artist.

Classical music
John AdamsChina Gates, for pianoPhrygian Gates, for piano
Samuel AdlerAeolus, God of the Winds, for clarinet, violin, cello, and piano
Concerto for Flute and OrchestraA Falling of Saints, for tenor, bass, chorus, and orchestraIt is to God I shall Sing, for chorus and organ
Kalevi Aho
Quintet, for 5 bassoons
Quintet, for flute, oboe, violin, viola, and cello
Necil Kazım Akses
Concerto for Orchestra
Concerto for Viola and Orchestra
Franghiz Ali-Zadeh – Zu den Kindertotenlieder (In Memoriam Gustav Mahler), for clarinet, violin, and percussion
Birgitte Alsted – Strygekvartet i CD, for string quartet
Javier Álvarez – Canciones de la Venta, for soprano, violin, viola, and baroque guitar
William AlwynInvocations (song cycle), for mezzo-soprano and pianoA Leave-Taking (song cycle), for tenor and piano
Charles Amirkhanian – Dutiful Ducks, for tape with optional live voices
Gilbert Amy
 Strophe, for soprano and orchestra (revised version)
 Trois études, for flute
Beth Anderson – Joan, for tape
Laurie AndersonAudio Talk, performance artOn Dit, performance artSome Songs, performance artStereo Decoy, performance artThat's Not the Way I Heard It, performance art
Ruth Anderson – Sound Portraits I–II, text pieces
Hendrik Andriessen – Ricercare, version for wind orchestra
Jurriaan AndriessenPsalmen-trilogie, for baritone, chorus, and orchestra
Symphony no. 7, The Awakening Dream, for keyboard and electronics
Symphony no. 8, La celebrazioneLouis Andriessen – Hoketus, for two groups of 6 players each
Denis ApIvorChant Eolien, for oboe and piano, op. 65
Concerto for Cello and Orchestra, op. 64
Violet Archer – Plainsongs, for mezzo-soprano and piano
Malcolm Arnold
Sonata, for flute and piano, op. 121Variations on a Theme of Ruth Gipps, for orchestra, op. 122
Larry Austin – Quadrants: Event/Complex no. 11, for double bass and tape
Luciano BerioCoro, for 40 voices and 40 instruments (revised version)
Fantasia, for orchestra (after Giovanni Gabrieli)Il ritorno degli snovidenia, for cello and 30 instrumentsSequenza VIII, for violin
Toccata, for orchestra (after Girolamo Frescobaldi)
Harrison Birtwistle – Silbury AirRob du BoisSkarabee, for orchestraZodiak, for one or more instruments or instrumental groups
John Buller – Proença for mezzo-soprano, electric guitar, and large orchestra
Enrique Crespo – American Suite No. 1George Crumb – Star-Child (1977, revised 1979) for soprano, antiphonal children's voices, male speaking choir, bell ringers, and large orchestra
Peter Maxwell DaviesA Mirror of Whitening Light, for chamber orchestraOur Father Which in Heaven Art, for flute, clarinet, piano, percussion, violin, celloRunes from a Holy Island, for flute, clarinet, piano, percussion, violin, celloWesterlings, for SATB choir
Franco DonatoniAlgo, for guitarAli, for violaDiario ’76, for four trumpets and four trombonesPortrait, for harpsichord and orchestraSpiri, for flute, oboe, clarinet, bass clarinet, celesta, vibraphone, 2 violins, viola, and celloToy, for 2 violins, viola, and harpsichord
Morton FeldmanInstruments 3, for flute, oboe, and percussionSpring of Chosroes, for violin and piano
Brian Ferneyhough – Time and Motion Study I, for bass clarinet
Lorenzo FerreroAriosoRomanza secondaFrans Geysen –Muziek voor toetsenbord, for pianoOmtrent sib, for three oboesOrgelstuk, for organPentakel, for oboeStadssteeg, for 6 oboes, 4 trumpets, 2 trombones
Alberto GinasteraBarabbas, opera (unfinished)
Concerto No. 1 for Cello and Orchestra, op. 36 (revised version)Glosses sobre temes de Pau Casals, for orchestra, op. 48
Alexander Goehr – Romanza on the Notes of Psalm IV, op. 38c
Sembiin Gonchigsumlaa – Symphony No. 2Pelle Gudmundsen-HolmgreenPassacaglia for tabla, clarinet, violin, cello and pianoSymfoni, Antifoni for orchestra
Rodolfo Halffter – Secuencia, op. 39, for piano
Bengt Hambraeus – Antiphonie: Cathedral Music for OrganAlan HovhanessAnanda, piano sonata, op. 303Celestial Canticle, for coloratura soprano and piano, op. 305Dawn on a Mountain Lake, for double bass and piano, op. 393Fred the Cat, piano sonata, op. 301Glory Sings the Setting Sun, cantata for coloratura soprano, clarinet, and piano, op. 292How I Love Thy Law, cantata for high soprano, clarinet, piano, op. 298Mount Belknap, piano sonata, op. 299, no. 1 (revised version)Mount Ossipee, piano sonata, op. 299, no. 2 (revised version)Mount Shasta, piano sonata, op. 299, no. 3 (revised version)A Presentiment, for coloratura soprano and piano, op. 304
Suite, for flute and guitar, op. 300 (1977)
Sonata, for oboe and bassoon, op. 302
Sonata, for 2 clarinets, op. 297
Sonata No. 1, for harpsichord, Op. 306
Sonatina ("Meditation on Mt. Monadnock"), for piano, op. 288The Spirit's Map, for voice and piano, op. 391Srpouhi, duet for violin and piano, op. 398
Symphony No. 31, for strings, op. 294
Symphony No. 32 ("The Broken Wings"), op. 296
Symphony No. 33 ("Francis Bacon"), op. 307
Symphony No. 34, for bass trombone and strings, op. 310
Maki IshiiBlack Intention, for recorderVoices—Violet, for gidayū ensemble, shō, and percussion
David C. Johnson – Ars Subtilior Electrica, electronic music
Mauricio KagelAn Tasten, étude for pianoMM51, film scorePrésentation für zweiQuatre degrés (Schlagzeugtrio für Holzinstrumente)Variété (Concert-Spectacle für Artisten und Musiker)
Jonathan KramerRenascence, for clarinet and tape (revised version)Studies on Six Notes, for harpsichord
György KurtágHommage à Mihály András (Twelve Microludes for String Quartet), op. 13
[untitled pieces], op. 15, for guitar (unpublished, withdrawn)
Helmut Lachenmann – Salut für Caudwell, music for two guitarists
André LaporteIcarus' Flight, for piano and twelve instruments
Mario LavistaPieza para caja de música, for music boxLos , incidental music
Luca LombardiTui-Gesänge, for soprano, flute, clarinet, piano, violin, and celloVariazioni su ‘Avanti popolo alla riscossa’, for pianoVariazioni, for orchestra
John McGuire – Pulse Music II, for four pianos and small orchestra
Tomás MarcoHerbania, for harpsichordHoquetus, for 1, 2, or 3 clarinets, live and/or recordedSicigia, for celloSonata de Vesperia, for pianoTormer, for harpsichord, violin, viola, and cello
Bo Nilsson – Madonna, for mezzo-soprano and instrumental ensemble
Pehr Henrik Nordgren
Violin Concerto No. 2, Op. 33Summer Music for orchestra, Op. 34Akinosuke-no-yume (安芸之助の夢; The Dream of Akinosuke) for piano, Op. 35Jyūroku-zakura (十六ざくら) for piano, Op. 36Jikininki (食人鬼) for piano, Op. 37Häjyt (The Evil Braggarts), orchestral music for the television play, Op. 38Butterflies for guitar solo, Op. 39
 (Yonder Lives My Sweet Love) for string orchestra, Op. 40
Per NørgårdCantica, for cello and pianoDen afbrudte sang (Orfeus og Euridike), for chorus, percussion, harp, and other instruments ad lib.Freedom, for tenor and guitarKredsløb, for SATB choirMating Dance, for flute (+ alto flute) and guitarRecall, for accordion and orchestra (revised version)Towards Freedom?, for orchestraTwilight, for orchestra
Arvo PärtCantus in Memoriam Benjamin BrittenFratresTabula RasaVariationen zur Gesundung von Arinuschka, for piano
Henri PousseurBallade berlinoise, for pianoLiège à Paris, electronic music
Einojuhani RautavaaraSuomalainen myytti (A Finnish Myth), for string orchestraSerenades of the Unicorn, for guitar
Aulis SallinenSimppeli Simme ja Hamppari, for mixed choir
Symphony No. 1
Dieter SchnebelCanon (‘Diapason’)Handwerke-Blaswerke I (Arianna), for 1 wind instrument, 1 string instrument, and 1 percussionistOrchestra, for orchestra
Quintet in B major, for piano and stringsRhythmen, for 2 guitars, organ, and percussion
Kurt Schwertsik
Concerto for Violin No. 1, op. 31Wiener Chronik 1848, ballet op. 28
Gerald ShapiroDance Suite, for pianoFor Nancy, wordless vocalise, for soprano and pianoQuestions, for SATB choirYou are Your Own Energy Source, electroacoustic dance score
Makoto Shinohara – Liberation, for orchestra
Roger Smalley – Seven Modulator Pieces, for 4 flutes
Karlheinz StockhausenAtmen gibt das Leben, for choir and orchestra, Nr. 39In Freundschaft, Nr. 46Jahreslauf, Nr. 47Jubiläum, for orchestra, Nr. 45Sirius, electronic music with trumpet, soprano, bass clarinet, and bass voice, Nr. 43Tierkreis, for chamber orchestra, Nr. 417/8
Tōru TakemitsuA Flock Descends into the Pentagonal GardenGitā no tame no jūni no uta, for guitarHanare goze Orin, film scoreOhan, incidental music for televisionQuatrain II, for clarinet, violin, cello, and pianoSabita honoo, film scoreSaigō Takamori den, incidental music for televisionToono monogatari wo yuku: Yanagida Kunio no fūkei, incidental music for televisionWater-ways for clarinet, violin, cello, piano, two harps, and two vibraphones
Michael Tippett – Symphony No. 4
Alexander Vustin – In Memory of Boris KlyuznerIannis Xenakis – JonchaiesIsang Yun – Concerto for Flute and Small Orchestra

Opera
William Alwyn – Miss Julie, opera in 2 acts, after Strindberg
Dominick Argento – Miss Haversham's FireLuciano Berio – Opera (revised version, 28 May, Teatro Comunale Florence)
Peter Maxwell Davies – The Martyrdom of St Magnus (June 18, Kirkwall, St Magnus Cathedral)
Julian Livingston – Twist of TreasonThea Musgrave – Mary, Queen of ScotsDonald Sosin – EstherKarlheinz Stockhausen – Atmen gibt das Leben (May 22, 1977, Nice)
Michael Tippett – The Ice Break (July 7, Royal Opera House, Covent Garden)
Morton Feldman  – Neither (1977, Rome Opera)

Jazz

Musical theatre
 The Act – Broadway production opened at the Majestic Theatre and ran for 233 performances
 Annie (Martin Charnin and Charles Strouse) – Broadway production opened at the Alvin Theatre on April 21, 1977, and ran for 2377 performances
 I Love My Wife – Broadway production opened at the Ethel Barrymore Theatre on April 17 and ran for 857 performances
 I Love My Wife – London production opened at the Prince of Wales Theatre on October 6 and ran for 401 performances
 The King and I (Rodgers and Hammerstein) – Broadway revival
 Privates on Parade –  London production opened at the Aldwych Theatre on February 17 and ran for 208 performances
 Side by Side by Sondheim – Broadway production opened at the Music Box Theatre and ran for 384 performances
 Oliver! (Lionel Bart) – London revival

Musical films
 ABBA: The Movie A Little Night Music Amar Akbar Anthony The Hobbit (animation)
 New York, New York Pete's Dragon Saturday Night FeverBirths
January 1
 Donna Ares, Bosnian singer (d. 2017) 
 Axel, Argentine singer and songwriter
 Jerry Yan, Taiwanese singer
January 3 – Michelle Stephenson, British singer and TV presenter (Spice Girls)
January 18 
 Richard Archer, British singer (Hard-Fi)
 Michael Tierney (musician), Australian singer (Human Nature) 
January 20 – Melody, Belgian singer
January 25 – Christian Ingebrigtsen, Norwegian singer (A1)
January 26 – Tye Tribbett, American singer-songwriter and keyboard player
January 28 – Joey Fatone, American singer (*NSYNC)
February 2
Shakira, Colombian singer, songwriter, dancer, businesswoman and record producer
Jessica Wahls, German pop singer
February 3 – Daddy Yankee, Puerto Rican musician
February 4 – Gavin DeGraw, American musician, singer-songwriter
February 8 – Dave "Phoenix" Farrell (Linkin Park)
February 11 – Mike Shinoda,  American musician, songwriter, record producer and graphic designer (Linkin Park, Fort Minor)
February 15 – Brooks Wackerman (Bad Religion)
February 18 – Sean Watkins, American guitarist and songwriter
February 20 – Amal Hijazi, Lebanese singer and model
March 2 – Chris Martin, English singer, songwriter, musician, record producer and philanthropist (Coldplay)
March 3 – Ronan Keating, Irish singer (Boyzone)
March 4 – Jason Marsalis, American jazz musician
March 6 – Bubba Sparxxx, American rapper
March 7 – Paul Cattermole, British singer (S Club 7)
March 10
Bree Turner, American dancer and actress
Colin Murray, British radio disc jockey
Matt Rubano, American rock bassist (Taking Back Sunday)
March 11 – Jason Greeley, Canadian singer
March 15 – Joseph Hahn American musician, DJ, director and visual artist (Linkin Park)
March 16 – Ben Kenney, American rock bassist (Incubus)
March 18 – Devin Lima, LFO
March 19 – Jorma Taccone, American actor, comedian, director, writer, producer, record producer and musician. (member of lonely island) 
March 24 – Natalie Hemby, American country music songwriter and singer.
April 9  – Gerard Way, American vocalist, visual artist, songwriter (My Chemical Romance)
April 17 – Frederik Magle, Danish composer, concert organist, and pianist
April 23 – John Cena, American professional wrestler, actor and singer
April 25 – Matthew West, American guitarist, singer, contemporary Christian (CCM)
April 28 – Joanne Yeoh, Malaysian violinist
May 1 – Dan Regan (Reel Big Fish)
May 7 – Lisa Kelly, Irish singer
May 8 – Joe Bonamassa, American musician
May 12 – Wu Fei, Chinese musician and composer
May 13 – Pusha T, American rapper and record executive. 
May 16 – Emilíana Torrini, Icelandic singer and songwriter
May 31
Scott Klopfenstein (Reel Big Fish)
Joel Ross, British disc jockey
June 3 – Yuri Ruley (MxPx)
June 5 – Nourhanne, Lebanese singer
June 8 – Kanye West, American rapper, singer, songwriter, record producer, fashion designer, and entrepreneur. 
June 10 
 Adam Darski, Polish musician (aka Nergal, Holocausto)
 Takako Matsu, Japanese singer-songwriter and actress
June 12 – Kenny Wayne Shepherd, guitarist
June 23 – Jason Mraz, American singer-songwriter, musician
June 25 – Tim Anderson (musician), American songwriter and producer 
June 28
Mark Stoermer, American rock guitarist (The Killers)
Harun Tekin, Turkish rock vocalist and guitarist (Mor ve Ötesi)
June 29 – DEALZ, American rapper
July 1 – Tom Frager, French-born singer and surfer
July 7 – Dan Whitesides, American drummer (The Used and The New Transit Direction)
July 10 – Jesse Lacey, American singer-songwriter and guitarist (Brand New and Taking Back Sunday)
July 12 – Airin Older, American musician
July 14 – Gordon Cree, composer
July 15 – Ray Toro (My Chemical Romance)
July 18 – Tony Fagenson (Eve 6)
July 28 – Coby Dick (Papa Roach)
July 29 
 Danger Mouse (Gnarls Barkley)
 Rodney Jerkins, American record producer, songwriter and rapper.
July 30 – Ian Watkins,  (Lostprophets)
August 2 – Dave Farrel, American musician
August 7 – Samantha Ronson, English DJ and singer-songwriter (Lindsay Lohan, Mark Ronson) 
August 10 – Aaron Kamin (The Calling)
August 12 – Park Yong-ha, South Korean actor and singer (d. 2010)
August 16 – Tamer Hosny, Egyptian singer/actor
August 17
Claire Richards, British singer and dancer (Steps)
Tarja Turunen, Finnish operatic soprano singer-songwriter 
August 19 – Katrina Woolverton, American singer-songwriter
August 30 – Jens Ludwig, German guitarist
August 31 – Craig Nicholls (The Vines)
September 1 – Chris Cain, American rock bassist (We Are Scientists)
September 2 – Elitsa Todorova, Bulgarian singer-songwriter
September 4
Ian Grushka (New Found Glory)
Lucie Silvas, English singer
September 6 – Kiyoshi Hikawa, Japanese enka singer
September 11
Jonny Buckland, British guitarist (Coldplay)
Ludacris, American rapper and actor
September 12 – 2 Chainz, American rapper and businessman
September 13 – Fiona Apple, American singer-songwriter
September 15 – Angela Aki, Japanese singer-songwriter
September 19 – Ioana Maria Lupascu, Romanian pianist
September 20 
Namie Amuro, Japanese singer
The-Dream,  American singer, songwriter and record producer (Christina Milian, Rihanna, Beyonce) 
September 23 – Susan Tamim, Lebanese singer and actress (murdered) (d. 2008)
October 1 – Owen Biddle, rock bass guitarist (The Roots)
October 5 – Wendy Vera, Ecuadorian musician and composer
October 12 – Young Jeezy, American rapper
October 13 – Justin Peroff (Broken Social Scene)
October 16
John Mayer, American musician (Taylor Swift, Katy Perry, Jessica Simpson) 
Chris Knapp, The Ataris
October 17 – Nicole Cabell, American operatic soprano
October 25 – Yehonathan Gatro, Israeli singer and actor
November 1 – Alistair Griffin, British singer and songwriter
November 4 – Kavana, British singer
November 7 – Wigor (Michał Dobrzański), Polish rapper and producer
November 8 
 Khia, American rapper, songwriter and record producer
 Tiffani Wood,  Australian singer-songwriter  (Bite Your Tongue, Bardot) 
November 10 – Brittany Murphy, American actress and singer (D. 2009) 
November 13
Chanel Cole, New Zealand-born singer
Huang Xiaoming, Chinese actor and singer
November 14 – Obie Trice, African-American rapper
November 15 – Logan Whitehurst, American one man band
November 20 – Daniel Svensson, Swedish drummer
November 21 – Annie (singer), Norwegian singer-songwriter and DJ
November 23 – Christopher Amott, Swedish guitarist
November 27 – Ivar Bjørnson, songwriter And guitarist (Enslaved (band))
November 30 – Steve Aoki,  American electro house musician, record producer, DJ, and music executive
December 1 
Brad Delson (Linkin Park)
Akiva Schaffer – member of The Lonely Island
December 7 – Dominic Howard, drummer (Muse)
December 9 – Imogen Heap, English singer, songwriter, record producer and audio engineer.
December 21 – Toby Rand, Australian singer-songwriter (Juke Kartel)
December 31 – Psy, South Korean singer-songwriter

Deaths
January 1 – Michael Mann, violinist, son of Thomas Mann, 57 (suicide)
January 2 – Erroll Garner, jazz pianist, 53 (heart attack)
January 16 – Tom Archia, jazz saxophonist, 57
January 23 – Dick Burnett, folk songwriter, 94
February 8 – Eivind Groven, microtonal composer and music theorist, 75
February 10 – Grace Williams, composer, 70
February 12 – Ernst Mehlich, German-Brazilian conductor and composer, 89
February 23 – Margaret Daum, operatic soprano, 70
February 26 – Bukka White, blues guitarist and singer, 67
February 28 – Eddie "Rochester" Anderson, comic actor and singer, 71
March 10 – E. Power Biggs, organist, 70
May 6 – Joseph Hislop, operatic and concert tenor, 93
May 9 – Harold Spivacke, music librarian and administrator, 72
May 22 – Hampton Hawes, jazz pianist, 48 (brain haemorrhage)
May 26 – William Powell (The O'Jays), 35 (cancer)
May 30 – Paul Desmond, jazz saxophonist, 52 (lung cancer)
June 5 – Sleepy John Estes, blues guitarist and singer, 78
June 13 – Matthew Garber, former child star of Mary Poppins, 21 (pancreatitis)
June 22 – Peter Laughner, American singer-songwriter and guitarist (Rocket From the Tombs and Pere Ubu), 24
June 30 – Ernst Oster, pianist, musicologist, and music theorist, 69 (stroke)
July 2 – Gert Potgieter, South African operatic tenor and actor, 47 (car accident)
July 20 – Gary Kellgren, American record producer, co-founded Record Plant, 38 (drowned)
July 26 – Gena Branscombe, composer and conductor, 95
August 16 – Elvis Presley, singer, 42 (heart attack)
August 19 – Groucho Marx, comedian, actor, singer and performer, 86 (pneumonia) 
September 1 – Ethel Waters, American blues, jazz and gospel singer, 80
September 5 – George Barnes, swing jazz guitarist, 56
September 13 – Leopold Stokowski, conductor, 95
September 16
Marc Bolan, singer-songwriter, 29 (car crash)
Maria Callas, operatic soprano, 53 (heart attack)
September 29 – Alexander Tcherepnin, composer, 78
September 30 – Mary Ford, guitarist and vocalist, 53 (diabetes-related)
October 13 – Shirley Brickley, the Orlons, 32 (shot)
October 14 – Bing Crosby, singer and actor, 74
October 19 – Marino Capicchioni, musical instrument maker, 82
October 20 – Ronnie Van Zant, 29, Steve Gaines, 28, and Cassie Gaines, 29, members of Lynyrd Skynyrd (plane crash)
November 5 – Guy Lombardo, violinist and bandleader, 75
November 14 – Richard Addinsell, Warsaw Concerto composer, 73
December 5 – Rahsaan Roland Kirk, jazz saxophonist, flutist, composer, 42 (stroke)
December 24 – Salvatore Papaccio, Canzone Napoletana tenor, 87
December 25 – Charlie Chaplin, actor and composer, 88
December 28 – Sam Brown, jazz guitarist, 38
December 30 – St. Louis Jimmy Oden, blues singer, 74date unknown'' – Jimmy Cooper, hammered dulcimer player, 70

Awards
Grammy Awards of 1977
Country Music Association Awards
Eurovision Song Contest 1977

References

 
20th century in music
Music by year